Chronic actinic dermatitis is a condition where a subject's skin becomes inflamed due to a reaction to sunlight or artificial light. Patients often have other related conditions of the skin that cause dermatitis in response to a variety of stimuli (e.g., flowers, sunscreens, cosmetics, etc.).

Symptoms
Once affected, the symptoms may not show for several days. The symptoms can be severe burning, itching, swelling and pain in the affected areas. The areas exposed to sunlight may have the appearance of a sunburn - where clothing is worn the skin is protected. There is no known reaction to moonlight, but reflections from windows and mirrors of sunlight can still cause damage.

Diagnosis
Diagnosis can occur at any age, ranging from soon after birth to adulthood. A GP may refer a patient to a dermatologist if the condition is not showing clear symptoms, and a variety of tests - usually completed at a hospital - can then determine the exact nature and cause of the patient's condition.

Reactions, which vary depending on the severity of the case, include rashes, flared 'bumpy' patches, affected areas being extremely hot to touch, and outbreaks shortly (or within 24 hours) after direct or indirect exposure to UVA and/or UVB light. The skin most likely reacts on the upper chest, hands and face, however it is not unlikely for reactions to happen all over the body. The patient may feel burning, stinging or throbbing sensations in these areas, which causes mild, yet uncomfortable pain in some patients. Others liken the pain and sensation to a chemical burn that doesn't go away. It is a mistake to think that the reaction is like a sunburn, it is far deeper in the skin and often requires the use of ingestible steroids as well as topical steroids in order to alleviate the condition to a degree. The best protection is to be fully covered from sunlight, even when cloudy or hazy. The use of UV-rated clothing is suggested as well as a UV-rated umbrella for outdoors.

See also 
 List of cutaneous conditions
 Photosensitivity with HIV infection
 Skin lesion

References

External links 

Skin conditions resulting from physical factors
Inflammations